Elizabeth Jackson may refer to:
Elizabeth Jackson (publisher), 18th century British publisher and printseller.
Elizabeth Hutchinson Jackson, mother of US President Andrew Jackson
Elizabeth Jackson (1865–1889), possible victim of Jack the Ripper
Elizabeth Jackson (journalist), Australian ABC Local Radio presenter
Elizabeth Jackson (athlete), competed in the 2005 World Championships in Athletics - Women's 3,000 metres Steeplechase

See also 
Betty Jackson (born 1949), British fashion designer
Bessie Jackson, American blues singer